Rebecca Johns (born 1971) is an author and educator.  She is a graduate of the University of Missouri's School of Journalism and the Iowa Writers' Workshop.  She is the author of Icebergs and The Countess.  Johns is a member of the DePaul University English Department  and teaches annually at the Iowa Summer Writing Festival  in Iowa City.

Early career
Rebecca Johns grew up in northern Illinois and attended Antioch Community High School. She then attended University of Missouri at Columbia, where she majored in Journalism and English (1993). Johns has written for several notable publications, including Mademoiselle, Woman's Day, Self, Cosmopolitan, the Chicago Tribune, Ladies' Home Journal, the Harvard Review, the Mississippi Review and Ploughshares.

Novels

Icebergs
Johns is the author of Icebergs (2006), which opens in Canada during World War II with a harrowing plane crash. Crewmember Walt Dunmore returns home, but his life and those of his family are forever altered by the damage the tragedy causes. Icebergs follows Walt and his family from Canada to the United States through multiple generations, with the past casting a shadow over their lives.  Icebergs was a finalist for the 2007 Hemingway Foundation / PEN Award for first fiction  and a recipient of the Michener-Copernicus Fellowship.

The Countess
The Countess is Johns's newest work (October 2010). The novel follows the life of Elizabeth Báthory (Erzsebet Báthory), the "Blood Countess" who was one of the historical figures some believe inspired the fictional Dracula.

References

External links

Rebecca Johns official website
DePaul University faculty

Living people
21st-century American novelists
University of Missouri alumni
Iowa Writers' Workshop alumni
DePaul University faculty
1971 births
American women novelists
21st-century American women writers
Novelists from Illinois
American women academics